Babayevo (Babay) is a rural locality (a village) in Kalmiyabashevsky Selsoviet, Kaltasinsky District, Bashkortostan, Russia. The population was 336 as of 2010. There are 7 streets.

Geography 
Babayevo is located 24 km southeast of Kaltasy (the district's administrative centre) by road. Vasilovo is the nearest rural locality.

References 

Rural localities in Kaltasinsky District